Nina Ulanova (occasionally romanised French-style as Oulanova; born 31 May 1978) is a Russian ice dancer. With former partner Michail Stifunin, she is the 1997 World Junior champion and 1998 Nebelhorn Trophy champion.

Personal life 
Nina Ulanova was born in 1978 in Moscow. She is the niece of Alexei Ulanov.

Career

Competitive career 
Having started skating when she was four, Ulanova trained in single skating under Rafael Arutyunyan until age 11 and then began ice dancing in Andrei Filippov's group.

Ulanova and her partner, Michail Stifunin, placed fifth at the 1996 World Junior Championships in Brisbane, Australia. In the 1996–97 season, they won gold at the 1997 World Junior Championships in Seoul, South Korea. After the event, Filippov moved to Australia and Ulanova/Stifunin joined Alla Belyaeva. They skated together until 1999, placing as high as fifth at the senior Russian Championships. 

During the 1999–2000 season, Ulanova competed with Alexander Pavlov. They placed fourth at the 2000 Russian Championships. Their partnership ended around 2001.

Professional career 
After joining Holiday on Ice, Ulanova performed with Martin Šimeček for seven years and then with Michał Zych for three years. In 2011, Ulanova appeared on series 6 of ITV's Dancing on Ice, partnered with Steven Arnold. They were voted off in episode 4. She took part in the 2011 Dancing on Ice Tour and partnered with professional skater Matt Evers. In 2012, she appeared on series 7 partnered with Matthew Wolfenden and won the series. 

Ulanova did not appear in series 8 due to her pregnancy. She was partnered with Kyran Bracken for the 2014 series of Dancing on Ice.

Competitive highlights 
GP: Grand Prix

With Pavlov

With Stifunin

References

1978 births
Russian female ice dancers
Living people
Figure skaters from Moscow
World Junior Figure Skating Championships medalists
Universiade medalists in figure skating
Universiade silver medalists for Russia
Competitors at the 1997 Winter Universiade
Competitors at the 1999 Winter Universiade